Walter Lowrie Weaver (April 1, 1851 – May 26, 1909) was an American lawyer and politician who served two terms as a U.S. Representative from Ohio from 1897 to 1901.

Biography 
Born in Montgomery County, Ohio, Weaver attended the public schools and Monroe Academy, and was graduated from Wittenberg College, Springfield, Ohio, in 1870. He studied law and was admitted to the bar in 1872 and commenced practice in Springfield, Ohio. Weaver was elected prosecuting attorney of Clark County in 1874, 1880, 1882, and 1885.

Weaver was elected as a Republican to the Fifty-fifth and Fifty-sixth Congresses (March 4, 1897 – March 3, 1901). He served as chairman of the Committee on Elections No. 2 (Fifty-sixth Congress). He was an unsuccessful candidate for renomination in 1900. After leaving Congress, he was appointed associate justice Choctaw-Chickasaw citizens' court at McAlester, Oklahoma, in 1902. He returned to Springfield, Ohio, in 1904 and resumed the practice of law. He died in Springfield, Ohio, May 26, 1909 and was buried in Ferncliff Cemetery.

Sources 

1851 births
1909 deaths
People from Montgomery County, Ohio
People from Springfield, Ohio
Wittenberg University alumni
County district attorneys in Ohio
19th-century American politicians
Republican Party members of the United States House of Representatives from Ohio